Scott Evans (born September 21, 1983) is an American actor. He is known for playing the role of police officer Oliver Fish on the ABC daytime soap opera One Life to Live, and the recurring role of Oliver on the series Grace and Frankie. He is the younger brother of actor Chris Evans.

Early life
Scott Evans was born September 21, 1983, and raised in Sudbury, Massachusetts. His parents are Bob Evans, a dentist, and Lisa (née Capuano) Evans, a dancer and later artistic director at the Concord Youth Theater. He has two sisters, Carly and Shanna, and an older brother, actor Chris Evans.

Scott Evans studied theatre at New York University. He is openly gay, having come out at age 19.

Career
Evans began playing the recurring role of police officer Oliver Fish on One Life to Live on January 15, 2008. He subsequently appeared briefly on Guiding Light as Trey in 2008, and guest-starred as Woody Sage in the June 22, 2008 Law and Order: Criminal Intent episode "Betrayed" as well as the role of Ben in the October 21, 2008, Fringe episode "The Cure." Evans was also seen as Chad the Mail Clerk in the 2009 film Confessions of a Shopaholic.

Initially brought in to One Life to Live for five episodes, Evans returned for a total of 137 episodes. In July 2009, his character Oliver Fish became involved in a romantic relationship with Kyle Lewis. The storyline came to wider attention when Patricia Mauceri, an actress who had played the recurring role of Carlotta Vega on the One Life to Live since 1995, was replaced after reportedly voicing personal religious objections to her character's involvement in his storyline. The storyline on One Life to Live was dropped and both Scott and Brett were let go in 2010. Evans also had a guest role on the AMC series Rubicon as an American involved in a serious terrorist attack with al-Qaeda.

In 2022, Evans played Darren Hayes' love interest in the music video for "Let's Try Being in Love".

Filmography

Film

Television

References

External links
 

1983 births
21st-century American male actors
American male film actors
American male soap opera actors
American male television actors
American gay actors
LGBT people from Massachusetts
Living people
Male actors from Massachusetts
People from Sudbury, Massachusetts